Roshchino is a rural locality (a selo) in Razdolnensky Selsoviet of Tambovsky District, Amur Oblast, Russia. The population was 146 as of 2018. There are 3 streets.

Geography 
Roshchino is located 27 km southwest of Tambovka (the district's administrative centre) by road. Razdolnoye is the nearest rural locality.

References 

Rural localities in Tambovsky District, Amur Oblast